Epsilon Pi Phi is a scholastic honor society recognizing academic achievement among students in the field of emergency management, homeland security, disaster research and science, criminal justice, and continuity management disciplines.

The society was established by The Foundation for Higher Education Accreditation (now the Council for the Accreditation of Emergency Management and Homeland Security Education) in 2006 in Washington, DC so that students within emergency management programs would have recognition of academic success and contributions to the profession.

It was admitted to the Association of College Honor Societies in 2017.

Chapter List
The chapters 

American Military/American Public University
Anna Maria College
Arkansas State University
Arkansas Tech University
California University of Pennsylvania
Campbell University
Capella University
Franklin University
Indiana University – Purdue University Indianapolis
Thomas Jefferson University (formerly Philadelphia University)
John Jay College
Metropolitan College of New York
Millersville University
Norwich University
Nova Southeastern University
Ohio Christian University
Rowan University
University at Albany, SUNY
University of Guam

See also

 Association of College Honor Societies

References

External links

 
  ACHS Epsilon Pi Phi entry
 Epsilon Pi Phi chapter list at ACHS

Association of College Honor Societies
Honor societies
Student organizations established in 2006
2006 establishments in Washington, D.C.